The Black Album is the second novel written by British author Hanif Kureishi. Published in 1995 by Faber and Faber, the novel was adapted for the stage in 2009 and explores Muslim fundamentalism, youth culture, sex, drugs, and alienation in a young British-Pakistani man's world that is being pulled in different directions by a modern lifestyle of London and traditional Muslim culture.

Kureishi, a British-Pakistani novelist, playwright, screenwriter, and filmmaker, premiered the adaptation at the Royal National Theatre in July 2009 and was awarded the second Asia House Literature Award on the closing night of Asia House Festival of Asian Literature.

Character List 

 Shahid (Protagonist): The son of Pakistani immigrants, a British-Pakistani student from Kent, UK, whose father has recently died. Shahid moves to London for college, seeking to find a sense of independence in identity.
 Chili : Shahid's older brother
 Deedee : Shahid's lecturer professor/lover/mentor
 Riaz : Shahid's friend, and means of introduction into radical Islam

Critical reception 
Although only having been staged recently, the reception to The Black Album has been neutral when compared to the Kureishi's novel. Many felt that the stage adaptation left out many of the details that made the novel memorable and powerful, instead feeling that the adaptation lost many of the details that readers felt were so elegantly explained in the novel.

"But the stage version does scant justice to the book's panoramic portrait of late-1980s London with its pubs, clubs and ecstasy-filled raves. In a nutshell, one misses the heady exuberance of Kureishi's descriptive writing." -The Guardian

The reception to the timing of the adaptation of the novel was positive as it came in the post-9/11 era of the world view. Kureishi had thought, back in the Nineties, of turning his novel into a film but it never happened. But a decade and a half on, in the wake of 9/11, 7/7 and the "war on terror", the relevance of the story became even greater. In an interview with the production team, it was asked: "Was it easy ... transforming the tale from page to stage? "The novel had a kaleidoscopic view of London," he says, "moving quickly from episode to episode. The play maintains that episodic sense. Hanif has retained a lot of the language of the original. The novel is full of deft wit. The play is too. It moves between the real and the absurd. Hanif calls it 'hyper-real'."

References 

Postmodern plays
Plays based on novels
2009 plays